Ridsdel is a surname. Notable people with the surname include:

John Ridsdel (1947–2016), English-born Canadian businessman and journalist
William Ridsdel (1844–1931), Swedish Salvation Army officer